L. N. Prasad Reddy (born 29 December 1977) is an Indian former cricketer. He played first-class cricket for Andhra  between 1998 and 2010. He played 53 first class matches and 29 List A matches. He is a right handed batsman and a wicket keeper.

See also
 List of Hyderabad cricketers

References

External links
 

1977 births
Living people
Andhra cricketers
Cricketers from Andhra Pradesh